Tibouchina dissitiflora is a species of flowering plant in the family Melastomataceae, native to Venezuela. It was first described by John Julius Wurdack in 1958.

References

dissitiflora
Flora of Venezuela
Plants described in 1958